The 1964 Texas Tech Red Raiders football team represented Texas Technological College—now known as Texas Tech University—as a member of the Southwest Conference (SWC) during the 1964 NCAA University Division football season. In their fourth season under head coach J. T. King, the Red Raiders compiled a 6–4–1 record (3–3–1 against conference opponents), tied for fourth place in the SWC, lost to Georgia in the 1964 Sun Bowl, and outscored opponents by a combined total of 166 to 120. The team's statistical leaders included Tom Wilson with 777 passing yards and Donny Anderson with 966 rushing yards and 396 receiving yards. The team played its home games at Clifford B. & Audrey Jones Stadium.

Schedule

References

Texas Tech
Texas Tech Red Raiders football seasons
Texas Tech Red Raiders football